The Soviet 107mm M1938 mortar was a scaled-down version of the 120mm M1938 mortar intended for use by mountain troops and light enough to be towed by animals on a cart.

History
In World War II, the 107mm mortar saw service with Soviet mountain infantry as a divisional artillery weapon.  Weapons captured by the Germans were given the designation 10.7 cm Gebirgsgranatwerfer 328(r).  Its last significant use in battle was in the Vietnam War. The ability to break down the weapon made it particularly suited to the rugged terrain of Vietnam.

The mortar fired a lighter high explosive round (OF-841) and a heavier HE round (OF-841A). The lighter HE round actually carried a larger bursting charge than the heavier round.  Both rounds used GVMZ-series point detonation fuzes.

Recently, the weapon has been seen in use by rebel forces during the 2011 Libyan civil war.

Users 

 
 
 
 
 
 
 
 
 

and many others

See also

Weapons of comparable role, performance and era
 Ordnance ML 4.2 inch Mortar - British equivalent
 M2 4.2 inch mortar - US equivalent

Notes

External links
 OF-841 round
 OF-841A round

World War II infantry mortars of the Soviet Union
107 mm artillery
Soviet chemical weapons program
Chemical weapon delivery systems
Military equipment introduced in the 1930s